Jane Hallaren is an American actress.  She is best known for her role in the film Lianna. Born February 13, 1940, in Brooklyn, N. Y.

Filmography 
 1997 : Home Improvement (television series)
 1994 : L.A. Law (television series)
 1992-1993 : Civil Wars (television series)
 1992 : Melrose Place (television series)
 1991 : My Girl : Randall
 1989 : Lost Angels : Grace Willig
 1989 : Moonlighting (television series) : Lydia Budroe Kraft
 1988 : A Night in the Life of Jimmy Reardon : Faye Reardon
 1988 : Matlock (television series) : Laura Frazier
 1987 : Santa Barbara (television series) : 
 1985 : Stark: Margaret
 1985 : Simon & Simon (television series) : Mrs. Glass
 1984 : The Paper Chase (television series) : 
 1984 : Unfaithfully Yours: Janet
 1983 : Rita Hayworth: The Love Goddess  : Virginia Van Upp
 1983 : Lianna : Ruth
 1981 : Body Heat : Stella
 1981 : Modern Romance: Ellen
 1980 : Hero at Large: Gloria Preston
 1988 : A Night in the Life of Jimmy Reardon: Faye Reardon

References

External links
 

20th-century American actresses
Year of birth missing (living people)
Living people
American film actresses
American television actresses
21st-century American women